This is a list of flag bearers who have represented Laos at the Olympics.

Flag bearers carry the national flag of their country at the opening ceremony of the Olympic Games.

See also
Laos at the Olympics

References

Laos at the Olympics
Laos
Olympic flagbearers
Olympic flagbearers